Huaypetue District (an adaptation from the Quechua word Huepetuche) is one of four districts of Manú Province in Peru.

References